Johannes Enschedé may refer to:

 Johannes Enschedé (1708–1780) (1708–1780), Dutch printer, owner of Royal Joh. Enschedé and collector
 Johannes Enschedé Jr. (1750–1799), Haarlem regent and collector
 Johannes Enschedé III (1785–1866), Haarlem newspaper editor and printer
 Johannes Enschedé IV (1811–1878), Haarlem newspaper editor and printer

See also
 Joh. Enschedé, a printer based in Haarlem, Netherlands